Batman, also known as Jace Fox, is a superhero appearing in American comic books published by DC Comics. Created by Len Wein and Irv Novick, he first appeared in Batman #313 (April 1979).

Fox is the son of Lucius Fox, assuming the identity of Batman beginning in the Fear State event. Rather than Gotham, he operates in New York City.

Fictional character biography 
Timothy Fox was the son of Wayne Enterprises CEO Lucius Fox. The two fell out due to Wayne competitor Gregorian Falstaff, who fabricated evidence that Bruce Wayne was a slumlord. Protesting his father and his business, Tim joined a gang led by his friend Ron Watkins, who was secretly an employee of Falstaff. After learning the truth about Watkins and Falstaff, he left the gang and made up with his father.

Later on, Tim fell in with the criminal group, The Terrible Trio, taking on the identity of The Vulture and attempting to rob guests of Bruce Wayne's penthouse, but was subdued and captured by Batman.

Infinite Frontier 
After years of absence, Fox returned under DC's Infinite Frontier relaunch. In his rebooted origin, Tim, due to his family's immense wealth, became a hedonistic playboy, indulging in a jet set life of non-stop partying and promiscuous affairs.

On the night before his seventeenth birthday, an angry Tim stormed out of his party after a failed attempt to seduce a girl who had caught his eye. While driving on the phone with another girl, Tim failed to notice a man crossing the street, ramming into him with his car. Tim went to check on the man, who was terribly injured, and, despite the man's pleas, Tim ran away to his father. Lucius hired a team of lawyers and private investigators to protect his son from the legal consequences. It was discovered that the victim was an alcoholic domestic abuser, and the team made the case that he was too drunk to notice the traffic light change. When Tim protested his father's actions, he was shipped off to military school. After a decade abroad being trained by multiple teachers, including that of Katana, Timothy, now going by his nom de guerre of "Jace", returned home as his father inherited the Wayne Family's fortune. His return home briefly upended the family, with his sister Tamara falling into a coma, his brother Luke refusing to acknowledge him, and his sister Tiffany becoming estranged from Luke. Eventually, Jace discovered one of Bruce Wayne's old Batsuits in an abandoned area in Wayne Enterprises.

The Next Batman 

Jace officially takes up the mantle of Batman, choosing to appropriate the Dark Knight's identity under the notion that his father and Bruce Wayne were corrupt. Subsequent skirmishes with the Magistrate led him to reconcile with Lucius, moving to New York City where Tamara would undergo her recovery. His arrival in New York resulted in him being forced to join the NYPD's Special Crimes Unit, nicknamed "Strike Force Bat," by Mayor Villanueva. He soon after faces off against Manray, his first villain, in an encounter that ends with Batman being forced to run, much to his embarrassment. Their next fight ends with Batman finally gaining the upper hand, though it sets off his tumultuous relationship with other NYPD officers.

The new Superman asked for Batman's help amidst the death of his father and the Justice League, seeking to form a new one, though Batman rebuffed him, not wanting to end up like his dead predecessor.

The Question came to New York City, seeking Batman's help with solving the murder of Anarky. Their investigation led them to discover that, although Anarky had been shot by a kid named Morris Caulfield, the lethal wounds had already been inflicted by someone else. They were able to solve the mystery, apprehending a group of radicals named The Rest of Us, with the Question passing on her mantle to Hadiyah, a friend of Batman's. However, Tiffany Fox had recently donned her own vigilante outfit, seeking to help a friend, and briefly fought with members of Strike Force Bat. Looking into the recent encounter, Batman was attacked by Sinestro, who manipulated his sense of reality to make him believe he'd murdered an officer.

Dark Crisis 
Being quickly defeated by Sinestro, Jace resolved to face his fears, going to confront him directly. Though Sinestro employed numerous constructs to whittle down the new Batman's hope, handing him a ring to end his own life, Batman used the ring to defeat him before Pariah retrieved him through a portal. Recognizing that Superman needed a Batman, he traveled to the Hall of Justice, where the heroes and Deathstroke's forces were having their final battle.

Arriving at the Hall of Justice with multiple other heroes, Batman worked with Mr. Terrific to alter Pariah's Anti-Matter Cannon, while Yara Flor used her lasso to distract him, and Superman held off his Dark Army. Batman successfully altered the machine, using it to defeat Pariah, and then joined the other heroes in the final battle, along with the returned Justice League.

Abilities 
Fox was trained at the Sanford Military Academy, and then by Katana and Vesey, giving him the necessary combat and surveillance skills to be Batman. He also uses a Batsuit designed by his friend Vol made from Non-Newtonian fluid, allowing his armor to be powerful but lightweight. He also uses his own Batcycle. Jace Fox has expertise in how computer hardware and software works so he was capable of mending and editing computer networks and even can hack them. He also have good marksman skills so he can throw weapons like boomerang, knives and shuriken with great accuracy.

Other versions 
 In the possible future of Future State, Jace succeeds Bruce Wayne as Batman, fighting to topple the Magistrate. He is also a member of the Justice League.

In other media

Video games 
 Jace Fox as Batman appears in the mobile game DC Legends.

Collected editions

References

African-American superheroes
Comics characters introduced in 1979
DC Comics superheroes
Batman
Characters created by Len Wein
Characters created by Irv Novick
DC Comics American superheroes
DC Comics male superheroes
DC Comics supervillains
DC Comics male supervillains
DC Comics martial artists
Superheroes with alter egos
Batman characters